WLSU (88.9 FM) is a radio station licensed to La Crosse, Wisconsin. The station is part of Wisconsin Public Radio (WPR), and airs WPR's "NPR News & Music Network", consisting of classical music,news, and talk programming.  WLSU also broadcasts local news and programming from studios in the Whitney Center at the University of Wisconsin-La Crosse.

The station first went on air in 1971, and a year later joined Wisconsin Public Radio.

See also Wisconsin Public Radio

References

External links
Wisconsin Public Radio

LSU
Wisconsin Public Radio
Classical music radio stations in the United States
NPR member stations
Radio stations established in 1973
1973 establishments in Wisconsin